Energy in Ukraine is mainly from gas and coal, followed by nuclear and oil. The coal industry has been disrupted by conflict. Most gas and oil is imported, but since 2015 energy policy has prioritised diversifying energy supply.

About half of electricity generation is nuclear and a quarter coal. The largest nuclear power plant in Europe, the Zaporizhzhia Nuclear Power Plant, is located in Ukraine. Fossil fuel subsidies were USD 2.2 billion in 2019. Until the 2010s all of Ukraine's nuclear fuel came from Russia, but now most does not.

In 2020, Ukraine transited more natural gas than any other country in the world and it remains the main transit route for Russian natural gas sold to Europe, which earns Ukraine about $3 billion a year in transit fees, making it the country's most lucrative export service. 
Although gas transit is declining, over 40 billion cubic metres (bcm) of Russian gas flowed through Ukraine in 2021, which was about a third of Russian exports to other European countries. Some energy infrastructure was destroyed in the 2022 Russian invasion of Ukraine.

Overview

Ukraine has a diversified energy mix, and no fuel takes up more than a third of the country’s energy sources. The primary fuel has traditionally been coal, which dropped to 30% in 2018. Natural gas (28%) and nuclear (24%) follow.

Gas

Coal

Electricity

Electricity production fell from 296 TWh in 1991 to 171 TWh in 1999, then increased slowly to 195 TWh in 2007, before falling again.

In 2011, Ukraine joined the European Energy Community, however there has been slow progress on implementing European energy regulations.

In 2014, total electricity production was 183 TWh; 88 TWh from nuclear, 71 TWh from coal, 13 TWh from natural gas, and 9 TWh from hydroelectricity. Electricity consumption was 134 TWh after transmission losses of 20 TWh, with peak demand at about 28 GWe. 8 TWh was exported to Europe. In 2015 electricity production fell to about 146 TWh largely due to a fall in anthracite coal supplies caused by the War in Donbass.

On 1 July 2019, a new wholesale energy market was launched, intended to bring real competition in the generation market and help future integration with Europe. The change was a prerequisite for receiving European Union assistance. It led to in increased price for industrial consumers of between 14% to 28% during July. The bulk of Energoatom output is sold to the government's "guaranteed buyer" to keep prices more stable for domestic customers.

Grid synchronisation with Europe

Since 2017 Ukraine sought to divest itself of dependency on the Unified Power System of Russia (UPS) and instead connect westwards to the synchronous grid of Continental Europe, thereby participating in European electricity markets. Power lines coupling the country to the grids of neighbouring Poland, Romania, Slovakia and Hungary existed, but were de-energised.

A necessary prerequisite of Ukrainian integration was for the country to successfully demonstrate it was capable of running in a islanded manner, maintaining satisfactory control of its own frequency. To do that would require disconnection from the UPS grid, and a date of 24 February 2022 was set. This proved to be the date Russia invaded Ukraine, but the disconnection nonetheless proceeded to schedule. Ukraine placed an urgent request to synchronise with the European grid to ENTSO-E, the European collective of transmission system operators of which it was a member, and on 16 March 2022 the western circuits were energised, bringing both Ukraine and Moldova, which is coupled to the Ukrainian grid, into the European synchronised grid. On 16 March 2022 a trial synchronisation started of the Ukraine and Moldova grid with the European grid.

Nuclear power

Renewable energy

Finance
Ukraine signed a loan agreement in-principle for $3.65 billion with the China Development Bank in 2012, during President Viktor Yanukovich's term of office, contingent on the development of agreed development projects in the coal and gas sectors. However, by April 2017 Ukraine had not agreed any suitable projects due to a "lack of convergence in the positions of [Uglesintezgaz] and the energy ministry".

Elementum Energy Ltd owns the most power plants.

See also

References

External links

 Map of Ukrainian power grids
 Christian Booß. Blackout - Die neue Strategie der russischen Hybridarmee. November 2022 auf H-und-G.info